Wymondley Roman Villa is a ruined Roman villa near Hitchin, Hertfordshire, England. It is also known as Ninesprings Roman Villa.
It is situated in the valley of the River Purwell in the parish of Great Wymondley. In Roman times, as now, the villa would have been above a wetland which is protected as the Purwell Ninesprings nature reserve.

Wymondley in Roman times
East of the villa there is an agricultural landscape extending towards a Roman road at Graveley. Wymondley preserves a field system of Roman origin; this early date for the field boundaries was proposed by Frederic Seebohm around the time the villa was excavated, and the idea is largely accepted by later scholars.

There is evidence of other Roman buildings at Great Wymondley, near the villa and in the centre of the modern village. We do not know on basis the Romans allotted the land at Wymondley. The people who lived at the villa may have been descendants of the pre-Roman British warrior aristocracy, as at some places the Romans returned the land to its original inhabitants. However, at other places the Romans are known to have distributed land to their army veterans. In the case of Wymondley, Applebaum speculates that some of the land was farmed by tenants of the villa's owners.

On the evidence of the continuity in field boundaries, the Anglo-Saxon settlement did not make a big change in the way the land was managed. In this respect, the medieval manor perhaps had a similar function to the Roman villa. However, excavations of the villa found evidence of "squatter hearths" at the villa itself. These features indicate activity, probably in the post-Roman period, by people who had no use for the luxurious installations at Wymondley such as heating by hypocaust and mosaic flooring.

Excavation and access
The site was partly excavated in 1884, revealing the remains of several rooms. Three of the rooms were heated by hypocaust. While the remains have traditionally been described as a villa, this may be a misnomer. The rooms have been interpreted as an integral bath suite belonging to a villa, or alternatively a separate bathhouse. 

The site, which is now under farmland, can be accessed via the Hitchin outer orbital path (HOOP).

Finds
Finds at the site include Roman mosaic, and Roman currency including a coin hoard, believed to have been deposited in the 3rd century, which consisted of radiates. On the evidence of coins found at the site, the villa may have been established shortly after 200 with occupation continuing until the 4th century.

References

Roman villas in Hertfordshire
Scheduled monuments in Hertfordshire